Platyias is a genus of rotifers belonging to the family Brachionidae.

The genus has almost cosmopolitan distribution.

Species:
 Platyias latiscapularis Koste, 1974 
 Platyias leloupi Gillard, 1957

References

Rotifer genera
Brachionidae